Fabian Kalig (born 28 March 1993) is a German former professional footballer who played as a defender.

Career 
Born in Wiesbaden, Kalig played for SV Niedernhausen and 1. FSV Mainz 05 II before, on 13 June 2016, he signed for Erzgebirge Aue on a two-year contract. In May 2018, he extended his contract with Aue until the end of June 2021.

Kalig announced his retirement from playing at the age of 28 in September 2021 due to cartilage damage.

Career statistics

References

External links
 

Living people
1993 births
Sportspeople from Wiesbaden
German footballers
Footballers from Hesse
Association football defenders
1. FSV Mainz 05 II players
FC Erzgebirge Aue players
2. Bundesliga players
3. Liga players
Regionalliga players